Wirragulla railway station is located on the North Coast line in New South Wales, Australia. It serves the rural locality of the same name. It is served by NSW TrainLink Hunter line services travelling between Newcastle and Dungog.

The station consists of a single concrete platform about three metres long. A ramp connects the platform with the small car park and Dungog Road.

History
A station first opened at Wirragulla on 14 August 1911 and this station featured a proper platform. On 20 October 1975, the station was demolished and replaced with the current concrete (wooden until ) platform to reduce the maintenance costs. In the late 1990s it was proposed that Wirragulla, along with Allandale and Belford would be closed, as all three stations had extremely low patronage, and there were some safety concerns at these stations. The proposal to close these stations was later withdrawn (though Allandale and Belford stations ended up shutting in 2005).

Platforms & services
Wirragulla is served by NSW TrainLink Hunter line services travelling between Newcastle and Dungog. There are five services in each direction on weekdays, with three on weekends and public holidays. It is a request stop with passengers required to notify the guard if they wish to alight.

References

External links
Wirragulla station details Transport for New South Wales

Railway stations in the Hunter Region
Railway stations in Australia opened in 1911
Regional railway stations in New South Wales
Short-platform railway stations in New South Wales, 1 car or less